El Cobre is a Cuban town and consejo popular ("people's council", i.e. hamlet) of the municipality of Santiago de Cuba, capital of the homonym province, with a population of about 7,000. Mainly known for a Basilica in honour of Our Lady of Charity, the patron saint of Cuba, it was until recently the site of a large copper mine worked by slaves, free coloured people, and for a while by miners from Cornwall.

History

Colonial era
The town of El Cobre grew up around the Cobre mine, the first open pit copper mine in Cuba.
Copper was first mined there in 1532.
The Spanish crown confiscated the mines in 1670 after the private contractor had failed to comply with the terms of his contract and had neglected them for years.
270 private slaves became the property of the king, and the town of El Cobre became a pueblo of king's slaves and free coloured people, a unique type of settlement in Cuba.
By 1730 El Cobre was one of just fourteen officially recognised settlements on Cuba, of which two or possibly three were Indian corporate pueblos.

In 1780 an attempt was made to return the mine to private hands and increase production.
By that time El Cobre had 1,320 inhabitants, including 64% royal slaves and 34% free coloured people, mostly manumitted descendants of slaves. 
2% were the private slaves of the free coloured people.
The men were mostly engaged in subsistence agriculture, while mining was mainly undertaken by the women.
For much of this period the Cobre mine was the only source of copper on the island, supplying Cuba and sometimes other places in the Caribbean.

The first great uprising of cimarrones, or escaped slaves, occurred in Cuba in the 18th century, and is commemorated by a large sculpture on a hill beside the town.
The  Monumento al Cimarrón was designed by Alberto Lescay Merencio and completed in 1997 as part of the UNESCO initiative to make people more aware of slavery.
The inconspicuous location on a hill above the mine, was chosen by a local babalao, or Santería spirit guide.

British mining
The mine had been abandoned by 1830.
The British El Compañía Consolidada de Minas del Cobre (Cobre Mining Company) acquired the mine and reopened it in the early 1830s. 
An adjacent concession was acquired and opened by the British El Real de Santiago (Royal Santiago Mining Company).
Both companies turned to Cornwall for skilled labour and for steam engines to pump out the mines.
A Protestant burial ground was opened since the Cornish, considered heretics, could not be buried in the Catholic cemetery.

Post-independence
The town was the location of one of the first uprisings in the Cuban War of Independence, on 24 February 1895, led by Colonel Alfonso Goulet with Rafael Portuondo Tamayo, delegate of the Cuban Revolutionary Party of the East.
In 1902, the mine was purchased by William A. Chanler, a wealthy New York businessman and a veteran of the Spanish–American War. 
Profits were initially robust enough that Chanler was able to loan $35 million to the Cuban government.
The mine was closed in 2001, laying off 325 workers.
The quarry filled with water, which is high in minerals, particularly sulphur.
Today the town is mainly known for the Basílica Santuario Nacional de Nuestra Señora de la Caridad del Cobre, the Sanctuary of the Virgin of Charity.

Geography
Located below the Sierra del Cobre, part of the Sierra Maestra mountain range, El Cobre lies 18 km west of Santiago de Cuba and 26 kn south of Palma Soriano. El Cobre River, also named Parada, flows south of it and forms a reservoir (Parada) few km east. The state highway "Carretera Central" (CC) crosses the northern side of the settlement.

Notable people
Luisa Pérez de Zambrana (1837-1922), writer and translator

See also
Basílica Santuario Nacional de Nuestra Señora de la Caridad del Cobre

References

Sources

External links

El Cobre on sacred-destinations.com
El Cobre Weather on accuweather.com

Populated places in Santiago de Cuba Province
Santiago de Cuba